"Real Love" is the debut single by the Time Frequency, released in 1992. It charted at number 60 on the UK Singles Chart. It can be considered the Time Frequency's signature song, due to it being the most well known song the band has released. The "1, 2, 1, 2" is sampled from the I Start Counting song "Lose Him".

In 1993, a remix of the song was released, titled "Real Love '93". It peaked at number eight on the UK Singles Chart, making it the group's most successful single. Another version of the song was released in 2002 titled "Real Love 2002", and reached No. 43 on the UK Singles Chart and No. 12 on the Scottish Singles Chart. It also peaked at No. 10 on the UK Dance Singles Chart and No. 4 on the UK Independent Singles Chart. Another version titled "Real Love 2006" was included on the compilation album Ultimate Scottish Clubnation.

Personnel
 Mary Kiani – vocals
 Jon Campbell – vocals, production

Charts

Original version

Remix

2002 version

References

1991 songs
1992 debut singles
1993 singles
2002 singles
The Time Frequency songs
Jive Records singles
Zomba Group of Companies singles